is a Japanese sports manga series written and illustrated by Tadatoshi Fujimaki. It was serialized in Shueisha's shōnen manga magazine Weekly Shōnen Jump from December 2008 to September 2014, with its chapters collected in 30 tankōbon volumes. It tells the story of a high school basketball team trying to make it to the national tournament.

An anime television series adaptation by Production I.G aired for three seasons from April 2012 to June 2015. A sequel manga, Kuroko's Basketball: Extra Game, was serialized in Jump Next! from December 2014 to March 2016. An anime film adaptation of the Kuroko's Basketball: Extra Game manga premiered in March 2017. A stage play adaptation opened in April 2016 followed by more stage adaptations.

The manga has been licensed for English-language release by Viz Media in North America. By November 2020, Kuroko's Basketball had over 31 million copies in circulation, making it one of the best-selling manga series.

Plot

The Teiko Middle School basketball team dominated basketball teams within Japan, winning the middle school Nationals for three consecutive years. The star players of the team became known as the "Generation of Miracles". After graduating from middle school, the five star players went to different high schools with top basketball teams. However, there was a rumor that there was another player in the "Generation of Miracles": a phantom sixth man. This mysterious player is now a freshman at Seirin High, a new school with a powerful, if little-known, team. Now, Tetsuya Kuroko – the sixth member of the "Generation of Miracles", and Taiga Kagami – a naturally talented player who spent most of his youth in the US, aim to bring Seirin to the top of Japan by taking on Kuroko's former teammates one by one. The series chronicles Seirin's rise to become Japan's number one high school team. The Generation of Miracles include Ryota Kise, Shintaro Midorima, Daiki Aomine, Atsushi Murasakibara, and Seijuro Akashi.

Seirin High team faced Ryota Kise's team first in a practice match. Although Kise was capable of copying all of Kagami's skills with added strength and speed, Kuroko's abilities helped narrow the distance and eventually, Seirin won this game. They then met Shintaro Midorima's school Shutoku in the preliminaries of Interhigh. The game was much more difficult; not only was Midorima considerably stronger than Kagami, but also Kuroko's ability of misdirection was completely shut down by Takao's Hawk Eyes. Seirin managed to defeat team Shutoku but their winning streak ended after they lost badly to Touhou Academy, whose basketball team included the Ace of the "Generation of Miracles" - Daiki Aomine. After this game, they lost their remaining two matches against Senshinkan and Meisei and were eliminated from the Interhigh. However, a new player arrives to join Seirin - Kiyoshi Teppei, the man who formed the Seirin Basketball team. They spent the entire summer training for the Winter Cup, even coincidentally meeting Shutoku while training.

In the preliminaries, they met team Shutoku again. This match ended into a tie, so Seirin needed to defeat team Kirisaki Daichi in order to advance. Kirisaki Daichi's captain was Makoto Hanamiya, a member of the Uncrowned Kings well-known for his underhanded methods to win a match. However, they won and gained a ticket to the Winter Cup.

Media

Manga

Written and illustrated by Tadatoshi Fujimaki, Kuroko's Basketball was serialized in the manga anthology Weekly Shōnen Jump from December 8, 2008 to September 1, 2014. The 275 individual chapters were collected and published into 30 tankōbon volumes by its publisher Shueisha, the first on April 3, 2009 and the last on December 4, 2014. A crossover chapter between the series and Kawada's Hinomaru Sumo, with a script written by Ichirō Takahashi, was published in the magazine on November 9, 2015. Kawada was formerly an assistant to Fujimaki on Kuroko's Basketball.

Fujimaki began a sequel titled  in Jump Next! on December 29, 2014. On December 27, 2015, Tadashi announced that he will end Kuroko's Basketball: Extra Game manga in the next issue in early March 2016. At their New York Comic Con panel, North American publisher Viz Media announced their license to the manga. They began releasing the series in 2-in-1 editions in 2016.

Anime

An anime adaptation based on the manga was produced by Production I.G. The series premiered on April 7, 2012 and ended on September 22, 2012. On April 5, 2012, Crunchyroll announced that they would simulcast the anime as part of their spring lineup of anime titles. As of September 22, 2012, the anime ended with a total of 25 episodes. The second season premiered on October 6, 2013 and ended on March 29, 2014, also with 25 episodes. The DVD and Blu-ray version of the second season was released on June 20, 2014, along with an episode which was designed around a specific chapter in the manga by Tadatoshi Fujimaki by working on chapter 124, and a bonus CD with an audio drama starring Satsuki Momoi. The third season premiered on January 10, 2015 and ended on June 30, 2015, with a total of 25 episodes. Three compilation films that compiled the anime series' Winter Cup arc opened in Japan in 2016. The first compilation film opened on September 3, 2016, titled Winter Cup Compilation ~Shadow and Light~, the second compilation film opened on October 8, 2016, titled Winter Cup Compilation ~Beyond the Tears~, and the third compilation film opened on December 3, 2016, titled Winter Cup Compilation ~Crossing the Door~.

An animated film adaptation was announced at the KuroBas Cup 2015 event on September 20, 2015. The film, titled Kuroko's Basketball The Movie: Last Game, adapts the Kuroko's Basketball: Extra Game manga. It was released in Japanese theaters on March 18, 2017. The staff and cast from the previous seasons returned to reprise their roles in the film.

On October 19, 2020, the SAG-AFTRA listed and approved an English dub for the series under the "Netflix Dubbing Agreement". The first season's English dub debuted on Netflix on January 15, 2021, with its second season on May 15, its third season on September 18, and the Last Game film's English dub on November 15.

Light novels
Five series of light novels have been written by Sawako Hirabayashi called Kuroko's Basketball: Replace and illustrated by Fujimaki. Each light novel focuses on the members of the Generation of Miracles. The first light novel Replace was released on March 4, 2011. A manga adaptation of the novel series illustrated by Ichirō Takahashi began on Shōnen Jump+ in January 2015.

Audio CDs

The music for the Kuroko's Basketball anime series were directed by four different composers. Ryosuke Nakanishi, R・O・N, and Alpha Eastman (21-25) were in charge of the first season while Yoshihiro Ike was in charge of the second season.

Video games
Three video games based on Kuroko's Basketball have been released. The first game  was released on August 9, 2012 for PlayStation Portable. A second game  was released on February 20, 2014 for the Nintendo 3DS. Shōri e no Kiseki sold 45,681 copies in its first four days on sale. A third game  was released on March 26, 2015 for the Nintendo 3DS. Kuroko also appears as a support character in the Jump crossover fighting game J-Stars Victory VS.

Stage plays
A series of 2.5D musical stage plays began in 2016. Kensho Ono reprised his role as Kuroko from the anime series. Additions to the main cast included Yuuya Asato as Taiga and Shota Onume as Aomine. The plays were directed by Norihito Nakayashiki, who also directed Hyper Projection Engeki Haikyu!!.

Reception
The Kuroko's Basketball manga series sold nine million units in Japan by September 2012. In May 2013, the manga has over one million copies of volume 1 in print. By 2013, the manga had over 23 million copies in circulation, a number that grew to 27 million by April 2014. By November 2020, the series has over 31 million copies in circulation. Individual volumes frequently appeared on Oricon's weekly lists of the best-selling manga in Japan, and many of them were some of the best-selling manga in the year 2012. Kuroko's Basketball was the third best-selling manga series of 2013, with 8,761,081 copies sold in a year. In 2014, the 24th volume of the manga had received an initial print run of one million copies; and the 30th volume in 2015 had an initial print run of 700,000 copies printed. The Kuroko's Basketball light novel series also sold well in Japan in 2014. The first light novel Replace was the ninth best-selling light novel series, while it was the sixth best-selling light novel volume with 215,859 copies sold. DVD sales of the anime series have also been featured on Oricon's weekly Japanese anime DVD rankings various times.

Kuroko's Basketball is often compared to Weekly Shōnen Jumps earlier basketball-themed manga Slam Dunk. However, Azusa Takahashi of Real Sound pointed out whereas Slam Dunk was very realistic, the newer series is more focused on entertainment and is strongly based in fiction with each character having a "special move." The anime series was awarded the 2013 Tokyo Anime Award in the Television Category.

Controversies
After the anime began airing in 2012, the series became popular with dōjinshi circles, particularly for yaoi dōjinshi, though there is no yaoi in the series itself. Several events at which dōjinshi of the series were to be sold, as well as several other locations linked to the series and the author Tadatoshi Fujimaki, including a television station airing the anime, a convenience store chain selling items of the series, and Fujimaki's alma mater Sophia University, received threatening letters containing a powder or liquid substance. It is still unknown if it is one individual behind all the threatening letters, nor is the reason for the threats known. Multiple doujinshi events, including Comiket, banned content related to the series, barring creators from selling Kuroko's Basketball-themed doujinshi at their events. The suspect, who was later revealed to be a 36-year-old man named Hirofumi Watanabe, was eventually caught and was arrested on December 15, 2013. Due to the loss of Kuroko's Basketball dōjinshi because of the threats, there was a special event that specifically focused on dōjinshi related to the series affectionately named Kuroket, organized by the Comic Market Preparatory Committee, held during the Comiket Special 6 – Otaku Summit 2015 on March 29, 2015. The event hosted approx. 2400 dōjinshi circles.

See also

Notes

References

External links
 Official website 
 Official Anime Website 
 Official Stage Play Website  
 
 
 

 
2.5D musicals
2012 anime television series debuts
2013 anime television series debuts
2015 anime television series debuts
Anime and manga controversies
Anime series based on manga
Bandai Visual
Basketball in anime and manga
Comedy anime and manga
Japanese sports television series
Mainichi Broadcasting System original programming
Medialink
Production I.G
Shueisha franchises
Shueisha manga
Shōnen manga
Tokyo MX original programming
Viz Media manga